Frederick William Bissett (1902- November, 1978) was a lawyer and later a Justice of the Supreme Court of Nova Scotia, Canada. He is mostly known as Viola Desmond's lawyer.

Personal life 
Bissett's parents moved from St. John's, Newfoundland Colony to Halifax, Nova Scotia when he was 3 months old. He graduated from Dalhousie University in 1926. He was Desmond's lawyer. He later became a Justice of Supreme Court of Nova Scotia in 1961. He retired in 1977 and died the following year.

Legal defense of Viola Desmond 

Bissett's decision to opt for a judicial review rather than appeal the original conviction proved disastrous. Furthermore, Bissett chose to focus the case on the issue of tax evasion and not on the basis of racial discrimination.

When dismissing the case, Justice William Lorimer Hall said:

Upon losing the case, Bissett refused to bill Desmond and his fees were donated back to William Pearly Oliver's Nova Scotia Association for the Advancement of Coloured People.

References

Bibliography
 

1902 births
1978 deaths
History of Nova Scotia
Judges in Nova Scotia
Schulich School of Law alumni
Emigrants from Newfoundland Colony to Canada